Icon Commerce College, established in 2004, is a general degree commerce college situated in Guwahati, Assam. This college is affiliated with the Gauhati University.  Icon Commerce College is a Gauhati University affiliated co- educational degree college of commerce for B.Com. and B.B.A. Since its inception in 2004, the college has been imparting degree level commerce education as per Gauhati university syllabus. Twelfth pass out students of AHSEC, CBSE and other recognized Boards are eligible for admission and students can offer major subjects in accountancy, management, and finance. Power point presentation programme in classrooms has been introduced which supplements conventional class room teachings. This college is one of the approved examination centres for B.Com and BBA of Gauhati University.

References

External links
 

Universities and colleges in Assam
Colleges affiliated to Gauhati University
Educational institutions established in 2004
2004 establishments in Assam